Zapornia is a genus of birds in the rail family Rallidae.

Taxonomy
The genus Zapornia was introduced in 1816 by the English zoologist William Elford Leach in a catalogue of animals in the British Museum. He included a single species, the little crake which is therefore the type species. The genus name is an anagram of the genus Porzana that was introduced by the French ornithologist Louis-Pierre Vieillot. The species now placed in this genus were formerly assigned to Porzana and Amaurornis.

The genus contains the following species: 

 Black crake, Zapornia flavirostra (formerly placed in Amaurornis)
 Sakalava rail, Zapornia olivieri (formerly placed in Amaurornis)
 Ruddy-breasted crake, Zapornia fusca  (formerly placed in Porzana)
 Band-bellied crake, Zapornia paykullii  (formerly placed in Porzana)
 Black-tailed crake, Zapornia bicolor  (formerly placed in Porzana)
 Brown crake, Zapornia akool  (formerly placed in Porzana)
 Baillon's crake, Zapornia pusilla  (formerly placed in Porzana)
 † St. Helena crake, Zapornia astrictocarpus (extinct)  (formerly placed in Porzana)
 Little crake, Zapornia parva  (formerly placed in Porzana)
 Spotless crake, Zapornia tabuensis  (formerly placed in Porzana)
 † Kosrae crake, Zapornia monasa (extinct)  (formerly placed in Porzana)
 † Tahiti crake, Zapornia nigra (extinct)  (formerly placed in Porzana)
 Henderson crake, Zapornia atra  (formerly placed in Porzana)
 † Hawaiian rail, 	Zapornia sandwichensis (extinct)  (formerly placed in Porzana)
 † Laysan rail, Zapornia palmeri (extinct)  (formerly placed in Porzana)

References

 
Bird genera